Senegal competed at the 2019 World Aquatics Championships in Gwangju, South Korea from 12 to 28 July.

Open water swimming

Senegal qualified one male open water swimmer.

Swimming

Senegal entered four swimmers.

Men

Women

Mixed

References

World Aquatics Championships
Nations at the 2019 World Aquatics Championships
2019